Jug II is a city district of Osijek, Croatia. Located in the southeast of the city, in 2001 it had 14,020 inhabitants in 6,102 households. 

The district's name in Croatian literally means "South II". Jug II's day is on 30 May.

History  

In the spring of 1967, the first inhabitants of the new district moved into completed buildings.

In 1969, Opatijska Street and many apartment buildings in other streets were built, which increased the quality of life in that part of Osijek.

References 

Districts of Osijek